American rock band The Black Keys have released 11 studio albums, two EPs, a live album, 21 singles, and 22 music videos.

Albums

Studio albums

Collaboration albums

Bootleg albums

Live albums

Video albums

Extended plays

Singles

Other charted songs

Other appearances

Music videos

Notes

References

Discographies of American artists
Rock music group discographies
Alternative rock discographies